Typha grossheimii is a plant species native to Iran, Iraq, Uzbekistan, Afghanistan, Kazakhstan, Kyrgyzstan, Azerbaijan, Armenia, and the Republic of Georgia.

References

grossheimii
Aquatic plants
Flora of Iraq
Flora of Iran
Flora of Uzbekistan
Flora of Afghanistan
Flora of Kazakhstan
Flora of Kyrgyzstan
Flora of Azerbaijan
Flora of Armenia
Flora of Georgia (country)
Plants described in 1949